Birsa Munda Athletics Stadium is a stadium in Ranchi, Jharkhand, India. It is used mostly for association football matches and for athletics. The stadium has hosted the opening and closing ceremonies of the 2011 National Games of India. It has seating capacity of 35,000 spectators.

Features

Birsa Munda Athletics Stadium was the inspiration behind the renovation of Jawaharlal Nehru Stadium, Delhi that hosted the opening and closing ceremonies of the 2010 Commonwealth Games. Among the ideas adopted by CWG organisers was the imported, dust and fireproof roof that has been used in the Ranchi stadium, which boasts a seating capacity of 35,000. To host all the athletics events, apart from the opening and closing ceremonies, the main stadium occupies pride of place in the  Mega Sports Complex. With its many elliptical pylons and ramps that lead to the upper tiers, it adds to the futuristic look of the area that houses seven other smaller stadiums.

The stadium's fire-, dust- and rust-proof roof is made of polytetrafluoroethylene (PTFE). Designed by an Australian firm (MakMax Australia), the  roof material was imported from Japan for  80 million and took four months to fix. It is maintenance free and has a 15-year warranty. The stadium has two such roofs, one at the VVIP section and one at the press box.

Four towers of high-lux lights are installed for conducting sports events at night.

As many as 12 double lifts have been fitted in the stadium. Four towers in the corners connect to middle and upper galleries. The pathways are designed to allow wheelchairs till the upper tier. Visitors will take this route. But, there will be no overcrowding or security problems when VVIPs and players enter the stadium. The disabled, too, can reach the top gallery without any difficulty.

An air-conditioned enclosure inside houses a six-lane warm-up track of 80 meters. No athletics stadium in India has such tracks. Participants can use this half-an-hour before their events.

The synthetic track, designed according to international standards, is imported from Switzerland. The grass, however, is home-grown – from Chennai.

Thirty-six lounges, with all basic facilities, are being prepared on the ground floor to accommodate state contingents. Besides, there are 32 dormitories that can accommodate 1,000 people.

References

Memorials to Birsa Munda
Football venues in Jharkhand
Athletics (track and field) venues in India
Sports venues in Jharkhand
Buildings and structures in Ranchi
Sports venues in Ranchi
Sport in Ranchi
Sports venues completed in 2009
2009 establishments in Jharkhand